Pterostylis alata, commonly known as the striped greenhood, is a species of orchid endemic to Tasmania. As with similar orchids, the flowering plants differ from those which are not flowering. The non-flowering plants have a rosette of leaves but the flowering plants have a single flower with leaves on the flowering spike. This greenhood has a white flower with prominent dark green stripes and a sharply pointed, brown-tipped dorsal sepal. Similar greenhoods growing on the Australian mainland were formerly known as Pterostylis alata but are now given the name Pterostylis striata.

Description
The flowers are white with dark green stripes. The dorsal sepal and petals are fused, forming a hood or "galea" over the column. Flowering occurs from May to August but mainly in June and July.

Taxonomy and naming
The striped greenhood was first formally described in 1806 by Jacques Labillardière who gave it the name Disperis alata. (Disperis is a genus of orchid mainly from Africa and Madagascar.) Labillardière published the description in Novae Hollandiae Plantarum Specimen from a plant he collected "in Van-Diemen's Land". In 1871 Heinrich Reichenbach changed the name to Pterostylis alata. The specific epithet (alata) is a Latin word meaning "winged".

Distribution and habitat
Pterostylis alata grows in open forest and coastal scrub in Tasmania. Pterostylis alata does not grow on the mainland of Australia and plants formerly placed in this species are now recognised as Pterostylis striata.

References

alata
Endemic orchids of Australia
Orchids of Tasmania
Plants described in 1806